The Chinese Ambassador to Tajikistan is the official representative of the People's Republic of China to the Republic of Tajikistan.

List of representatives

See also
China–Tajikistan relations

References 

 
Tajikistan
China